Bourn Brook is a common name for small rivers, reflected in a number of place names.  See:

 Bourn Brook, Cambridgeshire
 Bournbrook, Birmingham named after the Bourn Brook, a tributary of the River Rea, which it joins at Cannon Hill Park in Birmingham.
 Bournville, Birmingham

See also
 Bourne (disambiguation)
 Bourne Brook (disambiguation)